Juan Manuel Villa Gutiérrez (born 26 September 1938) is a Spanish retired footballer who played as a midfielder.

Club career
Born in Seville, Andalusia, Villa joined the youth system of Real Madrid at the age of 15, and made his professional debut for their reserves in 1959.

He never appeared in La Liga for the first team, but played in the competition with Real Sociedad and Real Zaragoza, amassing league totals of 183 games and 53 goals over the course of exactly ten seasons before retiring in 1971 at nearly 33.

International career
Villa earned three caps for Spain, all in 1964. His debut arrived on 11 March in the first leg of the 1964 European Nations' Cup's last qualifying stage, a 5–1 home win against the Republic of Ireland (7–1 aggregate).

Honours
Zaragoza
Copa del Generalísimo: 1963–64, 1965–66
Inter-Cities Fairs Cup: 1963–64

References

External links

1938 births
Living people
Footballers from Seville
Spanish footballers
Association football midfielders
La Liga players
Segunda División players
Real Madrid Castilla footballers
Real Madrid CF players
Real Sociedad footballers
Real Zaragoza players
Spain international footballers